An Empress and the Warriors is a 2008 Hong Kong-Chinese historical drama action film directed by Ching Siu-tung and starring Donnie Yen, Kelly Chen, Leon Lai and Kou Zhenhai.

Plot
The film is set in ancient China, probably during the period of the sixteen kingdoms when China was divided into a number of rival kingdoms. The state of Yan, founded by the Murong tribe of the Xianbei nation, has long been a target of attacks by the Zhao army. Princess Fei'er of Yan becomes the new ruler after her father, the Emperor, is killed in battle, with general Murong Xuehu assisting her in defending their kingdom from invasion.

Prince Yan Huba, nephew of the deceased king and a treacherous minister in Yan, schemes to take the throne from his cousin and he sends his men to assassinate the princess. Fei'er survives the attempt on her life but is seriously injured. She is rescued later by a mysterious hermit named Duan Lanquan and lives with him for a period of time until she recovers. The two of them develop romantic feelings for each other during that period of time. However, she ultimately must decide whether to fulfill her duty to her kingdom or follow her heart.

Empress Fei'er chooses to returns to Yan later and succeeds in resolving the conflict between Yan and Zhao. However, Huba is still plotting to take the throne and he leads his men to kill Duan Lanquan and Murong Xuehu. On the verge of danger, Empress Fei'er manages to kill Huba personally and put an end to Huba's evil plans, all while restoring peace and harmony by maintaining good relations with the other ten realms.

Cast
Donnie Yen as Murong Xuehu
Harashima Daichi as a child
Kelly Chen as Princess Yan Fei'er
Jiang Yiyi as young Princess Yan Fei'er
Leon Lai as Duan Lanquan
Guo Xiaodong as Yan Huba
Kou Zhenhai as Teng Bochang
Liu Weihua as King of Yan
Zhang Shan as King of Zhao
Chen Zhihui as Diao Erbao
Yan Jie as Prince of Zhao
Zhou Bo as Ao Jia
Zhou Zhonghe as tribal priest
Asoka Liu Shun as tribal priest's assistant

References

External links

An Empress and the Warriors on Hong Kong Cinemagic

2008 films
2000s Cantonese-language films
Films set in the Warring States period
Films directed by Ching Siu-tung
Hong Kong martial arts films
Wuxia films
Films with screenplays by James Yuen
Chinese historical films
2000s historical films
2000s Hong Kong films